Fontanières is a commune in the Creuse department in the Nouvelle-Aquitaine region in central France.

Geography
The commune has an eastern border with the department of Allier and is served by a TER railway.

Population

Sights
 The nineteenth-century church of Notre-Dame.
 A château in ruins at Salvert.

See also
Communes of the Creuse department

References

Communes of Creuse